Dávid Illés (born 18 February 1994) is a Hungarian football player who plays for Mosonmagyaróvár.

Club statistics

Updated to games played as of 2 December 2014.

References
MLSZ 

1994 births
Sportspeople from Győr
Living people
Hungarian footballers
Hungary youth international footballers
Association football midfielders
Győri ETO FC players
Lombard-Pápa TFC footballers
Budafoki LC footballers
FC Ajka players
Mosonmagyaróvári TE 1904 footballers
Nemzeti Bajnokság I players
Nemzeti Bajnokság II players
Nemzeti Bajnokság III players
21st-century Hungarian people